The 2024 United States Senate special election in Nebraska will be held on November 5, 2024, to elect the Class 2 member of the United States Senate from Nebraska, to complete the term of Ben Sasse, who resigned on January 8, 2023, to become the president of the University of Florida. On January 12, 2023, governor Jim Pillen appointed Republican former governor (and 2006 Senate candidate) Pete Ricketts to fill the seat for the remainder of the 118th United States Congress. Ricketts has committed to running in the special election and for a full term in 2026.

Appointment
Republican Pete Ricketts, former governor of Nebraska (2015–2023) and nominee for the U.S. Senate in 2006, was appointed on January 12, 2023.

Applied to be appointed 
In total, 111 individuals submitted applications for Sasse's seat, and nine candidates were interviewed by Pillen. Applicants included: 
Tom Becka, radio personality (Independent)
 Larry Bolinger, author and perennial candidate (Republican)
Sid Dinsdale, bank president and candidate for the U.S. Senate in 2014 (Republican)
 Greg Ibach, former Under Secretary of Agriculture for Marketing and Regulatory Programs (2017–21) and former Nebraska Director of Agriculture (2005–17) (Republican)
 Bryan Slone, president of the Nebraska Chamber of Commerce and Industry and Republican candidate for governor of Nebraska in 2014 (Independent)
 Melanie Standiford, former KNOP-TV news director (Republican)

Republican primary

Candidates

Declared
 Pete Ricketts, incumbent U.S. Senator (2023–present)

Publicly expressed interest
Charles Herbster, agribusiness executive and candidate for Governor of Nebraska in 2014 and 2022

Potential
Matt Innis, former chair of the Lancaster County Republican Party and candidate for the U.S. Senate in 2020

General election

Predictions

References

Nebraska special
United States Senate special
United States Senate 2024
Nebraska Senate 2024
2024 special
Nebraska 2024

External Links
John Glen Weaver (R) for Senate